Mary Margaret Haugen (born January 14, 1941) is an American politician. She was a Washington state senator from 1993 to 2013 and served chairwoman of the Senate Transportation Committee.

From 1982 to 1992, Haugen served in the Washington House of Representatives. Before that, she served three terms as a member of the Stanwood School Board.

Haugen is married and lives on Camano Island. She is a Democrat.

2012 Election

In the 2012 race for her State Senate seat, Haugen lost by 5% to Republican Barbara Bailey.

References

External links
Sen. Haugen's page on the Washington Senate Democratic Caucus website
Sen. Haugen's campaign site

1941 births
Living people
Washington (state) state senators
Women state legislators in Washington (state)
People from Camano, Washington
21st-century American politicians
21st-century American women politicians
20th-century American politicians
20th-century American women politicians
Members of the Washington House of Representatives